The Amazonas prison massacres occurred on 26–27 May 2019 after a series of riots at five different prisons in Amazonas, Brazil. 55 prisoners have thus far been killed. All the deaths involved inmates and all died from strangulation or stabbings. Authorities claim they have regained control of the prisons.

References

2019 murders in Brazil
History of Amazonas (Brazilian state)
Massacres in 2019
Massacres in Brazil
May 2019 crimes in South America
May 2019 events in Brazil
Prison uprisings in Brazil